Miriam Sarghini Aïda (born 24 September 1974) is a Swedish jazz singer.

She has toured internationally, performing at the Blue Note in Tokyo, in London, Paris, Istanbul, Moscow, Helsinki, Oslo, Palermo, Berlin and across Sweden. She has appeared on Swedish national television.

Aïda's music is influenced by many musical traditions, including Latin American, and she attained success with a Brazilian music-inspired album Meu Brasil. She performs with her partner, saxophonist Fredrik Kronkvist, and has since her 2002 debut released five albums with Kronkvist and the Jan Lundgren Trio. She lives in Malmö, where she manages a jazz club named Monk.

In 2017, she sang Brazilian music at the Uppsala International Guitar Festival in Sweden.

Discography
 2005 Meu Brasil (Connective)
 2006 Introduction (Sony/Columbia)
 2007 My Kind of World (Connective)
 2008 Come on Home (Connective)
 2009 Letras Ao Brasil (Connective)
 2011 Visans väsen (Connective)
 2014 É de lei! (Connective)
 2015 Quatro Janelas (Connective)
 2019 Loving The Alien (Connective)

References

Swedish jazz musicians
1974 births
Living people
21st-century Swedish singers